The LIU Brooklyn Blackbirds were the athletic teams representing Long Island University's campus in Brooklyn, New York in intercollegiate athletics, including men's and women's basketball, cross country, golf, soccer, and track; women's-only bowling, lacrosse, softball, tennis, and volleyball; and men's-only baseball. The Blackbirds competed in NCAA Division I and were members of the Northeast Conference.

A member of the Northeast Conference, LIU Brooklyn sponsored teams in six men's and thirteen women's NCAA sanctioned sports:

The LIU Brooklyn Blackbirds merged with the Division II LIU Post Pioneers after the 2018–19 academic year. The new program now competes as the LIU Sharks with a blue and gold color scheme.

Origin of "Blackbirds" nickname
Following Long Island University's founding in 1927, its sports teams wore blue uniforms and became known as the Blue Devils. After the school's uniforms were changed to black in 1935, a Brooklyn Eagle reporter from the Midwest saw the new look as the basketball team dribbled up and down the court and stated that the team looked like the blackbirds from back home; the comment struck home, and a new nickname was born.

Teams

Soccer
In soccer, Dov Markus played on the Blackbirds from 1965 to 1967. In 1965 as a sophomore, Markus scored 35 goals in 14 games for 70 points, at the time both the most-ever goals and the most-ever points in an NCAA season. Over his three-year career, Markus scored 79 goals, setting a new NCAA career record, in 49 games. Markus won the 1967 Hermann Trophy as the outstanding collegiate soccer player of the year.  He was the first recipient of the Hermann Trophy.  In 2000, LIU inducted Markus into its Athletic Hall of Fame.

Notable players

Shmuel Avishar (born 1947), Israeli basketball player
 Ivan Leshinsky (born 1947), American-Israeli basketball player
 Dov Markus (born 1946), Israeli-American soccer player

References

External links
  — current LIU program
 brooklyn.liuathletics.com — archived site specific to LIU Brooklyn